Economic-Trade School Tuzla (Bosnian: Ekonomsko-trgovinska škola Tuzla) is one of the oldest schools still in function in Bosnia and Herzegovina. It was formed in 1844. where it began working with 105 students, which were divided in three classes.

References

Schools in Bosnia and Herzegovina

Education in Tuzla
Buildings and structures in Tuzla